Raven Glacier is a glacier in northern Greenland. Administratively it belongs to the Northeast Greenland National Park.

The glacier was named by Robert Peary after Anton A. Raven, one of the founding members of the Peary Arctic Club in New York.

Geography 
The Raven Glacier is located at the northern end of Roosevelt Land. It flows roughly westwards to the south of Cape Washington. Its terminus lies on the eastern side of the mouth area of Hunt Fjord.

See also
List of glaciers in Greenland
Peary Land

References

External links
North Greenland Glacier Velocities and Calf Ice Production
Glaciers of Greenland
Peary Land